von der Heydt is a surname. Notable people with the surname include:

August von der Heydt (1801–1874), German economist
Eduard von der Heydt (1884-1964), German-born Swiss banker
James Arnold von der Heydt (born 1919), American lawyer and judge

See also
Von der Heydt Museum, museum in Wuppertal, Germany
Heydt